Hu Lipeng was a Chinese diplomat who served as the Chinese Ambassador to Angola between 1988 and 1992, and the Chinese Ambassador to Nigeria between 1992 and 1995.

References

Ambassadors of China to Angola
Ambassadors of China to Nigeria
Living people
Year of birth missing (living people)